Sunny Skies is a 1930 American Pre-Code musical comedy film directed by Norman Taurog, starring Benny Rubin and Marceline Day and produced by Tiffany Pictures. It is notable for a same-sex romantic subplot, involving a young man's tragically unrequited love for his football hero roommate.

Cast
Benny Rubin as Benny Krantz
Marceline Day as Mary Norris
Rex Lease as Jim Grant
Marjorie Kane as Doris
Harry Lee as Papa Krantz
Wesley Barry as Stubble
Greta Granstedt as College Widow
Robert Livingston as Dave 
James Wilcox as Smith
Eddy Chandler as Coach

Preservation status
The film is preserved at the Library of Congress, and is available from the Alpha Video label and can be viewed online at Internet Archive.

References

External links

AllMovie.com
Sunny Skies available for free download at Internet Archive

1930 films
Tiffany Pictures films
Films directed by Norman Taurog
1930 musical comedy films
American black-and-white films
American musical comedy films
1930s LGBT-related films
1930s English-language films
1930s American films